Leane Suniar (4 February 1948 – 21 November 2021) was an Indonesian Olympic archer.

She represented her country in the women's individual competition at the 1976 Summer Olympics. She came in 9th place after both rounds, finishing with 2352 points.

Suniar died from colon cancer on 21 November 2021, at the age of 73.

References

External links
 

1948 births
2021 deaths
Archers at the 1976 Summer Olympics
Indonesian female archers
Olympic archers of Indonesia
Sportspeople from Jakarta
Deaths from colorectal cancer
Deaths from cancer in Indonesia